This is a list of events in British radio during 1993.

Events

January
4 January – Terry Wogan returns to the Radio 2 breakfast slot with Wake Up to Wogan.

February
No events.

March
March – After nearly 15 years of presenting The Friday Rock Show on BBC Radio 1, Tommy Vance leaves the station to go to the forthcoming Virgin 1215.

April
3 April – Shortly after midnight BBC Radio 2 airs the final edition of its weeknight jazz programme, Jazz Parade. The programme is presented by Digby Fairweather and features the BBC Big Band conducted by Barry Forgie.
5 April – BBC Radio Bedfordshire expands to cover the counties of Buckinghamshire and Hertfordshire and is renamed BBC Three Counties Radio.
18 April – The Official 1 FM Album Chart show is broadcast on BBC Radio 1 for the first time. Presented by Lynn Parsons, the 60-minute programme is broadcast on Sunday evenings, straight after the Top 40 singles chart.
26 April – BBC Dorset FM launches as an opt-out station from BBC Radio Devon. The station broadcasts to the west and centre of the county – east Dorset was already covered by BBC Radio Solent. This is the last BBC local radio station to launch in an area previously not covered by a BBC local station.
30 April – Launch of Virgin 1215, Britain's second national commercial radio station, on Radio 3's old mediumwave frequency. The station starts broadcasting at 12.15 pm.

May
2 May – As part of its launch schedule, new national commercial station Virgin 1215 launches a weekly album chart show.
May – The broadcasting arrangements for Test Match Special are changed for the 1993 cricket season. The morning play is on BBC Radio 5, switching to BBC Radio 3 for the afternoon session.

June
No events.

July
25 July – The last Network Chart Show goes out on Independent Local Radio. 
July – Midland Radio Plc, which owns six stations, including BRMB, is acquired by GWR.

August
1 August – 'Doctor' Neil Fox introduces the first Pepsi Chart, a Sunday afternoon Top 40 Countdown show for commercial radio, and based on single sales and airplay. The programme was aired until December 2002.
8 August – Dave Lee Travis resigns on air from BBC Radio 1, stating that he could not agree with changes that were being made to the station. Travis told his audience that changes were afoot that he could not tolerate "and I really want to put the record straight at this point and I thought you ought to know – changes are being made here which go against my principles and I just cannot agree with them".
16 August – Les Ross returns to the BRMB breakfast show following a shake up of scheduling at BRMB and its sister station Xtra AM.
16 August – 20 September – Loud'n'proud, a series presented by DJ Paulette on BBC Radio 1, is the UK's first national radio series aimed at a gay audience.
23 August – Cricket is broadcast on BBC Radio 3 for the final time.

September
3 September – Simon Mayo leaves the Radio 1 Breakfast Show after five years in the chair. He is replaced by Mark Goodier  who presents the show until the end of the year.
September – The Radio Authority announces that it will not be renewing LBC's licence. The new licensee is to be London News Radio, a consortium led by former LBC staff and backed by Guinness Mahon.

October
October – Matthew Bannister takes over from Johnny Beerling as controller of Radio 1 and immediately makes major changes to the station's output in order to attract a younger audience. Major changes are made to the presenter line-up with long standing DJs, including Simon Bates, Gary Davies, Bob Harris and Alan Freeman, replaced with a raft of new younger presenters.
October – BBC Radio Clwyd closes although local news opt-outs for north east Wales continue until 2002.
October – Sunset 102 goes into liquidation.
25 October – John Inverdale joins BBC Radio 5 to present a new sports drivetime show. It replaces Five Aside which had been on air since the station launched.
30 October –
As part of the roll-out of the new Radio 1 schedule, Andy Kershaw and John Peel move from nighttime to Saturday afternoons, Danny Baker takes over the weekend morning show and the first Essential Mix is broadcast.
Radio Rovers launches, and therefore becomes the first dedicated football club radio station in the United Kingdom. The station provides matchday coverage for all of Blackburn Rovers FC's home games.

November
1 November – Liz Kershaw presents the first edition of a new BBC Radio 5 lunchtime show called The Crunch. Consequently, BFBS Worldwide moves to the mid-afternoon slot.
November – Michele Stevens replaces Danny Baker as the presenter of BBC Radio 5's breakfast programme Morning Edition.

December
18 December – BBC 2 broadcasts the Arena special "Radio Night", an ambitious simulcast with BBC Radio 4.
24 December – Steve Wright in the Afternoon ends its 13-year run on Radio 1 (although it will return to its slot in 1999).

Unknown
BBC GMR stops broadcasting on MW.
London station WNK closes. It had shared a frequency with London Greek Radio. WNK's closure allows London Greek Radio to begin full time broadcasts.

Station debuts
18 January – Signal Gold
1 March – The Bay
5 April – BBC Three Counties Radio
14 April – CFM
26 April – BBC Dorset FM
 30 April – Virgin 1215
 1 May – Ten 17
 21 May – Star FM
May – Country Music Radio
1 July – Radio Maldwyn
27 August – Marcher Coast
4 September – Wessex FM
7 October – Yorkshire Coast Radio
17 October – SGR Colchester
21 October – Q102.9
30 October – Radio Rovers

Changes of station frequency

Closing this year
August – Sunset 102 (1989–1993)
October – BBC Radio Clwyd (1980–1993)
Unknown – WNK (1989–1993)

Programme debuts
 4 January – Wake Up to Wogan on BBC Radio 2 (1993–2009)
 22 April – The Masterson Inheritance on BBC Radio 4 (1993–1995)
 1 August – The Pepsi Chart syndicated from 95.8 Capital FM (1993–2002)
 13 August – Struck Off and Die on BBC Radio 4 (1993–1994, 2000)
 11 October – The Shuttleworths on BBC Radio 4 (1993–2010)
 30 October – Essential Mix on BBC Radio 1 (1993–Present)
 11 November – Harry Hill's Fruit Corner on BBC Radio 4 (1993–1997)
 Lee and Herring's Fist of Fun on BBC Radio 1 (transferred to television 1995)

Continuing radio programmes

1940s
 Sunday Half Hour (1940–2018)
 Desert Island Discs (1942–Present)
 Letter from America (1946–2004)
 Woman's Hour (1946–Present)
 A Book at Bedtime (1949–Present)

1950s
 The Archers (1950–Present)
 The Today Programme (1957–Present)
 Sing Something Simple (1959–2001)
 Your Hundred Best Tunes (1959–2007)

1960s
 Farming Today (1960–Present)
 In Touch (1961–Present)
 The World at One (1965–Present)
 The Official Chart (1967–Present)
 Just a Minute (1967–Present)
 The Living World (1968–Present)
 The Organist Entertains (1969–2018)

1970s
 PM (1970–Present)
 Start the Week (1970–Present)
 Week Ending (1970–1998)
 You and Yours (1970–Present)
 I'm Sorry I Haven't a Clue (1972–Present)
 Good Morning Scotland (1973–Present)
 Kaleidoscope (1973–1998)
 Newsbeat (1973–Present)
 The News Huddlines (1975–2001)
 File on 4 (1977–Present)
 Money Box (1977–Present)
 The News Quiz (1977–Present)
 Breakaway (1979–1998)
 Feedback (1979–Present)
 The Food Programme (1979–Present)
 Science in Action (1979–Present)

1980s
 In Business (1983–Present)
 Sounds of the 60s (1983–Present)
 Loose Ends (1986–Present)

1990s
 Formula Five (1990–1994)
 The Moral Maze (1990–Present)
 Essential Selection (1991–Present)
 No Commitments (1992–2007)
 Room 101 (1992–1994)
 The Mark Steel Solution (1992–1996)

Ending this year
 5 January – Knowing Me Knowing You with Alan Partridge (1992–1993)
 3 April – Jazz Parade (1990–1993)
 24 December – Steve Wright in the Afternoon on BBC Radio 1 (1981–1993)

Births
28 January – Roman Kemp, radio music presenter
19 April – Kenny Allstar, DJ

Deaths
9 February – Richard Imison, 56, script editor for BBC Radio Drama (1963–1991)
29 November – Jack Longland, 88, radio broadcaster, educationalist and mountaineer

See also 
 1993 in British music
 1993 in British television
 1993 in the United Kingdom
 List of British films of 1993

References

Radio
British Radio, 1993 In
Years in British radio